The Lakhandei River is a river in southern Nepal and in the state of Bihar in India.  It is a main tributary of the Bagmati River.

In Nepal, the river basin lies in the Sarlahi District, and the river originates in the Sivalik Hills.  The river enters India in the Sitamarhi district of Bihar, and flows through the town of Sitamarhi. It floods heavily in sitamarhi.It then enters the Muzaffarpur district, and joins the Bagmati at Katra (within the Muzaffarpur district).before joining baghmati river split in two parts one part join baghmati while another one remain open & known as kali khadai near khangura village.

The Lankhandei is known for flooding.

See also
List of rivers in India

References

Rivers of Madhesh Province
Rivers of Bihar
Rivers of India